Diana Santos Fleischman (born April 22, 1981) is an American evolutionary psychologist. Her field of research includes the study of disgust, human sexuality, and hormones and behaviour. She is also involved in the effective altruism, animal welfare, and feminism movements.

Personal life and education
Fleischman was born in São Paulo, Brazil and raised both Jewish and Catholic. She grew up in the Southern United States and was not taught about evolution in the public school system there. She was passionate about evolution from an early age, earning the nickname "monkey girl" from classmates at age 12. Her undergraduate degree is from Oglethorpe University and she also spent a year at the London School of Economics as an undergraduate. She was awarded her PhD in 2009 from the University of Texas at Austin, where her advisor was David Buss, and went on to do a postdoc at UNC Chapel Hill.

Fleischman is a member of Giving What We Can, a community of people who have pledged to donate 10% of their income to the world's most effective charitable organisations.

On November 29, 2019, she married fellow American evolutionary psychologist Geoffrey Miller. The couple had earlier appeared together in an interview advocating for polyamory. They have one child together, born in spring 2022.

Career
Since her postdoc at UNC Chapel Hill, Fleischman has been a lecturer in the department of psychology at the University of Portsmouth from 2011 to 2020; she is currently on sabbatical. One of her more covered findings in the press is that disgust inhibits sexual arousal in women. In addition to academic publications and lectures, she also gives public lectures and writes articles for the layperson. She argues that eating beef is more ethical than eating chicken because it kills fewer animals per gram of meat.

In August 2020, she started a blog at Psychology Today called How to Train Your Boyfriend, the same title of a book she is writing.

Frequently cited publications

References

External links

 University of Portsmouth profile

1981 births
Living people
Evolutionary biologists
Evolutionary psychologists
Oglethorpe University alumni
University of Texas at Austin College of Liberal Arts alumni
People from São Paulo
Women evolutionary biologists
Sentientists